

This page lists board and card games, wargames, miniatures games, and table-top tabletop role-playing games published in 1977.  For video games, see 1977 in video gaming.

Games released or invented in 1977

Significant games-related events of 1977
Playboy Enterprises, Inc. publishes first issue of Games magazine.
Games Workshop publishes first issue of White Dwarf magazine.

See also
 1977 in video gaming

Games
Games by year